Sinal Samer Breiche (born 3 March 2003) is a Lebanese footballer who plays as a goalkeeper for Lebanese club BFA and the Lebanon national team.

International career
Breich made her senior international debut for Lebanon on 30 August 2021, as a starter in a 5–1 win against Sudan in the 2021 Arab Women's Cup. She was called up to represent Lebanon at the 2022 WAFF Women's Championship, helping her side finish runners-up.

Honours
Lebanon
 WAFF Women's Championship runner-up: 2022

See also
 List of Lebanon women's international footballers

References

External links
 

2003 births
Living people
People from Chouf District
Lebanese women's footballers
Women's association football goalkeepers
Akhaa Ahli Aley FC (women) players
Beirut Football Academy players
Lebanese Women's Football League players
Lebanon women's youth international footballers
Lebanon women's international footballers